Shyam Manohar Goswami (IAST: Śyāma Manohara Gosvāmī, Hindi: श्याम मनोहर गोस्वामी, Gujarati: શ્યામ મનોહર ગોસ્વામી) also known as Shyamu Bava (IAST: Śyāmu Bāvā, Hindi: श्यामु बावा, Gujarati: શ્યામુ બાવા), is the 16th descendant of Shri Vallabha Acharya, sanskritists, philosopher, spiritual leader, active reformer & guru of the Krishna-centered Pushtimarg sect of Vaishnavism.

Life

Childhood
Shyam Manohar Goswami was born in Mumbai, India. His father Goswami Shri Dikshitji Maharaj was a well renowned Pushtimarg guru, was the 15th descendant of Shri Vallabha Acharya.

Academia & Research

He was the lecturer on Vallabh Vedanta at the 91st session of the Indian philosophical congress held in February 2017 at the Sanchi University of Buddhist-Indic Studies in Madhya Pradesh, India.

Pandit Jasraj has done extensive research in Haveli Sangeet under Shyam Manohar Goswami to create numerous innovative bandish (composition).

Bibliography
Shyam Manohar Goswami has written, and continues to write independent works on Pushtimarg theology and philosophy. 
He has also written commentaries on most of Vallabha's works, including all sixteen treatises.

Books

Mahāprabhu Śrī Vallabhācārya, Sanskrit, 1995
Puṣṭividhānam, Sanskrit, 1995
Prasthānaratnākaraḥ, Sanskrit, 1999
Anyākhyativadya vidvatsaṅgoṣṭhī, Sanskrit, 2002
́Srīmadvallabhamahāprabhustotrāṇi, Sanskrit, 2005 
Srīpuruṣottamapratiṣṭhāprakāraḥ, Hindi, 2005
Adhunik nyāyapraṇālī aura pushṭimārgīya sādhanāpraṇālī kā āpasī ṭakarāva, Hindi, 2006
Gr̥hasevā aura Vrajalīlā, Hindi, 2006
Vallabhvedanta nibandha saṅgraha, Hindi, 2006
Pratyakṣapramā : vidvatsaṅgoṣṭhī, Sanskrit, 2007
Vādāvalī : Brahmavādapramukhānām anekavādānāṃ saṅkalanarūpa, Sanskrit, 2008
Viśodhanikā, Hindi, 2008
Brahmavāda : Vādāvalī sampādakīya, Hindi, 2008
Pushti Siddhant Achariya Sabha, Gujarati, 1992
Balkrishna Granthvali, Gujarati, 1999
Bhagvatseva no Suddh Prakar, Gujarati, Hindu Samvatsara 2050
Seva kaumudi, Hindi, Hindu Samvatsara 2064
Pushti Bhakti Tatha Sharnagati Mai Fal, Hindu Samvatsara 2068
Purusharth Vyavastha – Dharm Arth Kaam Moksh, Hindi, Hindu Samvatsara 2068
Anubhashya nu Adhyayan, Hindi, Hindu Samvatsara 2068 
Navratna Updesh Manas Shastriya Vishleshan, Hindi, Hindu Samvatsara 2069
Ahankar Mimamsa, Hindi, Hindu Samvatsara 2070
Ahankar Mimamsa Dwitiya, Hindi, Hindu Samvatsara 2070
Kapil Geeta Anubhashya, Gujarati, Hindu Samvatsara 2070
Lagu Granth Sangraha, Hindi, Hindu Samvatsara 2070
Geeta Sankshep, Gujarati, Hindu Samvatsara 2072
Sharnagati Vichargosthi, Gujarati
Ras Drashti ni Tarfenma, Gujarati
Pushtimargiya Peethadheesh, Gujarati
Amrit Nu Achman, Gujarati
Dharm Arth Kaam Moksh ni Pushtimargiya Vivechana, Gujarati
Bhakti Vardhini Keshod Pravachan Ansh, Gujarati
Bhaktivardhini Vakhyata, Gujarati
Chirkut Charcha Samiksha, Hindi
Dharm Arth Kaam Moksh ki Pushtimargiya Vivechana, Hindi
Shri Damodardasji – Shri Krushnadas Meghanji – Vaarta Vivechan, Hindi
Paschimi Darshan Rooprekha, Hindi
Siddhantvachanavali Gurjar Bhasha Bhavanuvad Sahit, Gujarati
Amrut Vachanavali, Gujarati

Articles

Brahmavaadi Sahishnuta, Hindi
Vaishnavi Aastha Pratham, Gujarati
Vaishnavi Aastha Dwitiya, Gujarati
Multiplex Concepts of Yoga, English

Book Edits
Avataravadavali
Pustividhanam

References

External links
 

1940 births
Living people
Bhakti movement
Vaishnavism
Vaishnava sects
20th-century Hindu philosophers and theologians